The Evil Eye is a 1920 American action film serial directed by J. Gordon Cooper and Wally Van. It stars boxer Benny Leonard. It is considered to be a lost film.

Cast
 Benny Leonard as Frank Armstrong
 Ruth Dwyer as Dora Bruce
 Stuart Holmes as Berton Bruce
 Walter Horton as David Bruce
 Marie Shotwell as Mrs. David Bruce
 Rosita Marstini as Marcia Lamar (credited as Madame Marie Marstini)
 Leslie King as Holy Joe The Money Lender
 Bernard Randall as Dopey Dick

Chapter titles
 Below the Deadline 
 In the House of the Blind Men 
 The Golden Locket 
 Vengeance of the Dead
 Trapped by Treachery 
 On the Wings of Death 
 The Double Cross
 (unknown title)
 Ferocious foes 
 Evil influence 
 A Monstrous Menace 
 The Path of doom 
 The House of horror 
 The Death boxer 
 Winning out

See also
 List of film serials
 List of film serials by studio
 List of lost films

References

External links

1920 films
1920s action films
1920 lost films
American silent serial films
American black-and-white films
Lost American films
American action films
1920s American films
Silent action films
1920s English-language films